Piictu is a free photo-sharing mobile app founded in 2011 by Jonathan Slimak based in New York City. It is avaible in iOS operation system. Users are encouraged to capture an image on their phone and share it to a subject-appropriate album, or "stream". All streams are public, and users are encouraged to reply to a subject with topical pictures creating a photo-conversation. Topics for Piictu streams range widely and feature challenges, games, memes, tutorials, status updates, and more.

History
Piictu development began in New York City in late November 2010.

In July 2011, Piictu got accepted into the TechStars accelerator program.

In March 2013, Piictu started to work on secondary projects; like a collaboration with Kandu, a mobile software creation tool by Betaworks.

References

External links

 "Elevator Pitch: Piictu" interview with Alan M. Meckler.
 "Piictu: Secrets of Successful Startups" interview with CBS News.
 Piictu on iTunes

Companies established in 2011
Image-sharing websites
IOS software
American photography websites